Chris Ellis (born February 11, 1985) is a former gridiron football defensive lineman. He was drafted by the Buffalo Bills in the third round of the 2008 NFL Draft. He played college football for the Virginia Tech Hokies, where he was a First-team All-ACC selection. He has also been a member of the Pittsburgh Steelers and Saskatchewan Roughriders.

Early years
Ellis was ranked 66th on SuperPrep's Elite 100 list following his senior season when he led Led Bethel with 50 tackles - seven for loss - and 10 sacks. He was named an All-American by both SuperPrep and PrepStar as a defensive lineman. He was named to the VHSCA All-Eastern Region honorable mention squad as a defensive end  He Posted 75 tackles and 15 sacks as a junior.

College career
The most experienced of Tech's defensive linemen  when he totaled 53 tackles, 9 for a loss, and 8.5 sacks and ranked second in QB hurries (15) and caused a fumble that was returned for a touchdown against Kent State. In 2006, he closed out the season with 38 tackles (8.5 for losses) and 4.5 sacks. In 2005, he had a total of 41 tackles, 10.5 TFL, 6.0 sacks and 14 hurries. In 2004, he earned third-team Freshman All-America honors from The Sporting News after playing in all 13 games, recording 33 tackles were 7.5 tackles for loss and 3.0 sacks. He also had a fumble recovery, a forced fumble, three pass break ups and 14 quarterback hurries. 2003: Worked at defensive end while redshirting. He had the best vertical jump (31½") among the incoming freshmen linemen. He upped his vertical to 35 inches by spring practice, the fifth-best leap on the entire defense and turned in the top 40 time among the ends at 4.56 and bench pressed 350 pounds.

Professional career

Buffalo Bills
Ellis was drafted by the Buffalo Bills in the third round of the 2008 NFL Draft. He was moved to the OLB position under George Edwards in Buffalo's new 3-4 defense prior to the 2010 NFL season. He was waived on October 11, 2010.

Pittsburgh Steelers
The Steelers signed Ellis to their practice squad on November 2, 2010. However, he was waived on August 30, 2011.

Saskatchewan Roughriders
Ellis was signed by the Saskatchewan Roughriders as a defensive lineman on March 22, 2012.

Coach
After retiring as a player in 2013, Ellis has taken on several coaching positions, mostly as defensive line coach.

References

External links

 Just Sport Stats
 Official bio
 Chris Ellis 2008 NFL Draft Scouting Report

1985 births
Living people
Sportspeople from Hampton, Virginia
Players of American football from Virginia
American football defensive ends
Virginia Tech Hokies football players
Buffalo Bills players
Pittsburgh Steelers players
Saskatchewan Roughriders players